Kathryn Mary Mitchell,  (born May 1963) is the vice-chancellor of the University of Derby.

Early life 
Mitchell was born and brought up in St Helens in Lancashire. Her father died when she was young, and she was brought up by her mother, who was a deputy head. Mitchell attended the Notre Dame High School, a direct grant grammar school, before going on to the University of York to read psychology.

Career
She became a biological psychologist after largely teaching herself molecular biology.

Mitchell became a Wellcome fellow studying neurotransmitters at the Institute of Psychiatry in London. This work was related to Alzheimer's disease, and she was able to work with Nobel laureate Paul Greengard. She worked at the University of Chicago, the Rockefeller Institute in New York and the Friedrich Miescher Institute in Basel.

Professor Mitchell was deputy vice-chancellor of the University of West London. She was also Pro Vice-Chancellor Academic and Student Support Services and Dean of Students at West London University.

Mitchell was appointed as vice chancellor of the University of Derby in July 2015, succeeding John Coyne, who retired. She is the first woman Vice Chancellor at the University of Derby.

She is a Deputy Lieutenant of Derbyshire.

She was appointed Commander of the Order of the British Empire (CBE) in the 2022 New Year Honours for services to higher education.

References

 

1963 births
Living people
Academics of King's College London
Alumni of the University of York
Deputy Lieutenants of Derbyshire
People associated with the University of Derby
People associated with the University of West London
People from St Helens, Merseyside
Vice-Chancellors by university in England
Commanders of the Order of the British Empire